Peaster is an unincorporated community in Parker County, Texas, United States, nine miles (14 km) northwest of Weatherford.

History
Settlement began in the 1870s when Georgia native H.H. Peaster bought  of land and built a house. The community that developed near the site of his home was originally called Freemont; in 1885 the name was changed to Peasterville. Throughout the 20th century, Peaster has served area farmers as a school and church community. During the mid-1920s the town's population grew to approximately 300, but this was soon followed by a steep decline after the Great Depression. From 1975 to 1990, Peaster had around 80 residents. Current estimates put the population at approximately 100.

Education
The Peaster Independent School District serves the community and home to the Peaster High School Greyhounds.  Peaster High School has many sports which include:  Basketball, Baseball, Football, Golf, Tennis, Track and Field, Softball, Volleyball, and Cross-country.

Notable people
Peaster is the birthplace of writer Robert E. Howard, creator of the character Conan the Barbarian.

External links
 
 
 Peaster Independent School District

Unincorporated communities in Parker County, Texas
Dallas–Fort Worth metroplex
Unincorporated communities in Texas